Andrew Joseph Planta, also known as Andreas Joseph von Planta (1717–1773) was a Swiss Reformed pastor who emigrated to England, where he became librarian at the British Museum. He was born in Susch, studied theology in Zürich and worked as pastor in the Italian-speaking Protestant parish of Castasegna. He published an Italian psalter and book of prayers in 1740. In 1745, he obtained an MA degree at the University of Erlangen. 

After working as an educator at the court in Ansbach, he moved to London in 1752 to take up the post of pastor of the German Reformed congregation. He became assistant librarian at the British Museum in 1758, reader and tutor to Queen Charlotte in the 1760s and was elected as a Fellow of the Royal Society in 1770. Several of his daughters worked as governesses at court or in noble families. His son Joseph Planta succeeded him at the British Museum and later became its principal librarian.

Early life and family 

Planta was born on 4 August 1717 (O.S.) in Susch. His father was the  Joseph Planta (1692–1729) and his mother was Elisabeth Conrad from Fideris. The  was at his time one of the most important families of the Engadin area. While there are unverified claims that the family is related to a Roman family of the same name that had dealings with Emperor Claudius, the family is more reliably documented since 1139 or 1244.

Education and early career 

In 1734, Planta studied theology at the Schola Tigurina in Zürich; he passed an examination by the synod and was ordained in Ilanz in Grisons in 1735. In 1736 or 1737, he became pastor of the parish of Castasegna, one of very few parishes with an Italian-speaking Protestant population. He also translated Johann Hübner's children's bible into Italian, which appeared in 1743 as  without acknowledgment of the translator, but the second edition of 1785 and the Ladin edition of 1770 both credit Planta.

In 1745, Planta went to the recently founded University of Erlangen, where he obtained an MA degree with a dissertation entitled  (A docimastical exercise showing an outline of general philosophy). Reports that he obtained a doctorate or that he was professor of mathematics in Erlangen are not correct. From 1745, Planta worked as educator of prince Alexander at the Ansbach court of Charles William Frederick, Margrave of Brandenburg-Ansbach and his wife Princess Friederike Luise of Prussia. He likely also taught mathematics at the Gymnasium Carolinum.

Life in London 

After travelling to London, where his brother Martin had lived 1749–1750, with the permission of the Ansbach court, Planta became pastor of the German Reformed congregation at the Savoy Chapel in London in 1752, serving until 1772. His inaugural sermon on 22 October 1752,  was printed in London. The family lived in Bloomsbury. In 1757, Planta became French tutor to Mary Eleanor Bowes. In 1758, he obtained the post of assistant librarian at the British Museum; more precisely, he was Assistant Keeper of Natural History from 1758–1765 and Assistant Keeper of Printed Books 1765–1773. After 1761, he served as reader and taught Italian to Queen Charlotte. In 1765, during Leopold Mozart's journey to London with his family, Planta entertained the Mozart family at Montagu House and showed them around the museum, probably on the occasion of a gift of Wolfgang Amadeus Mozart's music to the museum. In his Natural History role at the museum, Planta was succeeded by Daniel Solander and in Printed Books by his son Joseph Planta. In 1768, Carl Gottfried Woide was appointed as assistant pastor; he later succeeded Planta as pastor of the German congregation.

Planta was elected a Fellow of the Royal Society on 15 March 1770. The citation on his election certificate was "Andrew Joseph Planta of the British Museum MA, & Minister of the German Reformed Church at the Savoy, a Gentleman of good learning, and well versed in natural knowledge, being desirous of becoming a member of the Royal Society; we recommend him, of our Personal acquaintance, as likely to be a valuable & useful member". His proposers were Gregory Sharpe, Gowin Knight, Henry Baker, Jerome de Salis, Joseph Ayloffe, Matthew Duane, Charles Morton, Samuel Harper, Matthew Maty, Richard Penneck, Henry Putman, Joshua Kirby and John Bevis. Planta himself was one of the proposers when Johann Reinhold Forster was elected a Fellow of the Royal Society in February 1772.

Planta died in 1773. His burial was on 3 March 1773 in St George's, Bloomsbury.

Personal life and children 
Planta married Margarete Scartazzini de Bolgiani from Bondo in 1738. They had six daughters and one son. The family spoke Romansh at home also during their time in London.
Anna Planta, born in Castasegna, married Christian Minnick (or Minnicks or Munich) in 1762, who emigrated to Pennsylvania
Elizabeth Planta (1740/41–1823), governess to Mary Eleanor Bowes from 1757, married in 1777 John Parish, Superintendent of Ordnance at the Tower of London. They moved to Gibraltar in 1791. After her husband's 1798 death, Elizabeth Planta returned to England and died in Petersham on 24 April 1823, aged 82.
Joseph Planta, born 10 February 1744 in Castasegna, principal librarian of the British Museum, died 1827.
Frederica Planta born 10 November 1750, died 2 February 1778, governess and English teacher of the daughters of George III and Queen Charlotte
 ("Peggy"), succeeded her sister after the latter's death, died in 1834.
Anna Elizabeth (Eliza) Planta (1757–1816), succeeded her sister Elizabeth as governess to Mary Eleanor Bowes from 1776, married Reverend Henry Stephens in 1777. She moved to Russia after 1789 to work for Catherine Shuvalova. Her daughter Elizabeth later married Mikhail Speransky but died soon after giving birth to a daughter, Elisabeth Bagréeff-Speransky in 1799.
Ursula Barbara Planta, youngest daughter, died 4 November 1834

Footnotes

Sources 

 

1717 births
1773 deaths
Fellows of the Royal Society
Andrew
Swiss emigrants to the United Kingdom
Swiss Christian religious leaders
Employees of the British Museum
Swiss translators
Translators to Italian